Martirez is a surname. Notable people with the surname include:

 Jean Martirez (born 1963), Filipino-American television journalist
 Yoyong Martirez (born 1951), Filipino basketball player

See also
 Martinez (surname)